The Adriatic Highway is a road that stretches along the eastern coast of the Adriatic Sea and is part of the European route E65. The road passes through Croatia, with smaller stretches through Bosnia and Herzegovina and Montenegro and ends at the Montenegro-Albania border. It is an undivided two-lane road for almost its entire length, with the exception of a short stretch through Zadar and a  dual-carriageway section from Plano (Trogir) to the southeast suburbs of Split. It was planned in the 1930s and built in the 50s and 60s. The dual carriageway is planned to be extended further southeast to Omiš. Completion of the Adriatic Ionian motorway is proposed in order to replace the Adriatic highway as a high-performance road transport route along the Adriatic coast.

Sections
Adriatic Highway runs along the east coast of the Adriatic Sea and passes through three countries: Croatia, Bosnia and Herzegovina and Montenegro. Most of the highway is located in Croatia.

Croatian section

Croatian section of the highway is officially named D8 state road, and it runs from Slovenian border crossing via Rijeka via Senj, Zadar, Šibenik, Split, Opuzen and Dubrovnik to the border with Montenegro at Karasovići. Most of the D8 is still a two-lane road, excepting rare four-lane stretches. Like all other state roads in Croatia, it is maintained by Hrvatske ceste.

Until recent times the highway has been the primary route connecting Adriatic coastal parts of Croatia. Since the 2000s multilane motorways have taken over most of its traffic, and yet more motorways are still being built along the coast. The motorways parallel to the road are A7 (Rupa border crossing-Sveti Kuzam), A6 (Rijeka-Bosiljevo) and A1 (Bosiljevo-Zadar-Split-Ploče). Since Adriatic Highway closely follows the well-indented Croatian coastline, travel is considerably longer and less safe compared to the motorways because of numerous blind curves and at-grade intersections. D8 state road is still popular as an alternative to the tolled highways, so the road carries fairly constant traffic during most of the year. The traffic intensifies in the summer, because of substantial traffic to touristic destinations.

The D8 section from Rijeka to Senj experiences heavy traffic in particular because many motorists are unwilling to take the longer route along A6 and A1, even though the motorway route normally requires shorter travel time. This problem used to be further exacerbated before 2009 when A6 still had slow semi-highway parts on the Rijeka-Bosiljevo route. This section will remain congested at peak intervals until eventual completion of A7 motorway between Rupa and Žuta Lokva.

Further  after Ploče drivers also encounter a small strip of Bosnia and Herzegovina territory around town of (Neum) between Klek and Zaton Doli. After that section, the highway continues to Dubrovnik close to the coastline.

Upon the completion of A7 and A1 the part of Adriatic Highway spanning from Ploče to Dubrovnik are planned to be upgraded to an expressway bypassing Neum in Bosnia and Herzegovina entirely via a series of tunnels and bridges, Pelješac Bridge being the most notable among them. The possibility of other upgrades remains open.

East of Dubrovnik the road passes by Dubrovnik Airport and reaches the border with Montenegro at Karasovići (Debeli Brijeg on the Montenegrin side).

Bosnia and Herzegovina section
The highway passes through a small strip of Bosnia and Herzegovina territory at Neum and is classified as M-2 road. The border crossings are at Neum 1 (with Klek on the Croatian side) to the west of Neum, and Neum 2 (with Zaton Doli on the Croatian side) to the east.

Montenegrin section

Within Montenegro, the road is official classified as M-1 highway and it runs from Debeli Brijeg border crossing with Croatia through Herceg Novi, Kotor, Budva, Petrovac, Sutomore, Bar, Ulcinj and ends at Sukobin border crossing with Albania, having two lanes through its entire length.

The road itself runs around the Bay of Kotor through Kotor, but through traffic uses the ferry connection across the Verige Strait between Herceg Novi and Tivat via the M-11 road. Verige bridge spanning the eponymous strait is planned to be built in the future, bypassing most of the bay.

The Montenegrin section, albeit as narrow as Croatian, still remains the only feasible route along the Adriatic coast. No littoral motorways are planned in Montenegro yet.

There are three major roads from the Adriatic Highway to inland Montenegro – at Budva, via M-10 to Cetinje, at Petrovac, via M-2 to Virpazar and Podgorica, and at Sutomore, via the Sozina Tunnel (M-1.1), also to Virpazar and Podgorica.

The road is the part of E65 and E80 European routes starting from Debeli Brijeg border crossing, and the European route E851 starting from Petrovac. At Sutomore, the E65 and E80 routes go to the north and leave the road via the Sozina Tunnel, while the E851 continues on the M-1 to Sukobin border crossing.

Sources

Roads in Croatia
Roads in Montenegro
Highways in Bosnia and Herzegovina

bs:Državni put D8 (Hrvatska)
cs:Silnice D8
hr:Državna cesta D8
sh:Državna cesta D8